Neil Gilbert Strain (b. February 24, 1926 in Kenora, Ontario - d. June 6, 1989) was a professional ice hockey player who played 52 games in the National Hockey League.  He played with the New York Rangers.

External links

1927 births
1989 deaths
Canadian ice hockey left wingers
Ice hockey people from Ontario
New York Rangers players
Sportspeople from Kenora